Waynman Dixon (1844–1930) was a British engineer, known for his work on the Great Pyramid of Giza and for discovering the only Egyptian artefacts to be found inside that pyramid.

The three objects found in the Great Pyramid of Giza, the so-called "Dixon Relics", are tools: a small dolerite ball, a copper hook (both now in the British Museum in London), and a fragment of cedar wood in the Marischal Museum, Aberdeen. He also discovered two shafts out from the Queen's Chamber of the Great Pyramid, similar to those that connect the King's Chamber to the outside wall of the pyramid, although these don't extend all the way.

Outside of his interest in Egypt, he worked as a manager of Sir Raylton Dixon & Co, a Cleveland-based shipbuilding company, alongside his brothers in Middlesbrough: he retired from the board of the company in 1917. He also served as an honorary consul of Japan in later life. One brother, John Dixon (1835–1891), designed the cylinder that transported Cleopatra's Needle from Egypt to London, and Waynman himself was tasked with building it around the obelisk. The other brother, Sir Raylton Dixon, was also an engineer and shipbuilder, and served as Mayor of Middlesbrough.

Honours
In 1896, Dixon was appointed a Knight of Grace of the Venerable Order of St John (KStJ). He was awarded the Service Medal of the Order of St John in 1900. In 1922, he was awarded the Order of the Sacred Treasure (Third Class) by the Emperor of Japan.

References

1844 births
1930 deaths
19th-century British engineers
British Egyptologists
British shipbuilders
Recipients of the Order of the Sacred Treasure, 3rd class
Knights of Grace of the Order of St John
Honorary consuls
Great Pyramid of Giza